Agrotera albalis is a moth in the family Crambidae. It was first found on the island of Príncipe, between 450 and 600 m elevation, by Thomas Alexander Barns in 1926, and first described by Koen V. N. Maes in 2003.

References

Moths described in 2003
Moths of Africa
Spilomelinae
Fauna of Príncipe
Invertebrates of São Tomé and Príncipe